The 2006 AMD at The Glen was a NASCAR Nextel Cup Series race that was held on August 13, 2006, at Watkins Glen International in Watkins Glen, New York. Contested over 90 laps on the 2.45 mile (3.942 km) road course, it was the 22nd race of the 2006 NASCAR Nextel Cup Series season. Kevin Harvick of Richard Childress Racing won the race.

There were only five drivers eliminated from the race; all due to racing accidents.

Background
Watkins Glen International (nicknamed "The Glen") is an automobile race track located in Watkins Glen, New York at the southern tip of Seneca Lake. It was long known around the world as the home of the Formula One United States Grand Prix, which it hosted for twenty consecutive years (1961–1980), but the site has been home to road racing of nearly every class, including the World Sportscar Championship, Trans-Am, Can-Am, NASCAR Sprint Cup Series, the International Motor Sports Association and the IndyCar Series.

Initially, public roads in the village were used for the race course. In 1956 a permanent circuit for the race was built. In 1968 the race was extended to six hours, becoming the 6 Hours of Watkins Glen. The circuit's current layout has more or less been the same since 1971, although a chicane was installed at the uphill Esses in 1975 to slow cars through these corners, where there was a fatality during practice at the 1973 United States Grand Prix. The chicane was removed in 1985, but another chicane called the "Inner Loop" was installed in 1992 after a fatal accident during the previous year's NASCAR Winston Cup event.

The circuit is known as the Mecca of North American road racing and is a very popular venue among fans and drivers. The facility is currently owned by International Speedway Corporation.

Qualifying

Race recap
Kurt Busch had the pole position for this race, in Penske Racing's #2 Miller Lite-sponsored Dodge. Busch was seeking his first road course win of his Cup career, following numerous near-misses and his Busch win the previous day. Busch controlled the race early before being penalized for coming onto pit road when it closed due to an untimely caution. Busch was sent to the rear of the field and the race then got controlled by Tony Stewart and Kevin Harvick who passed Tony during the final 3 laps to win the race. 

It was Harvick's first road course win of his career and the top-ten also ended with some road course aces finishing in the top ten; Robby Gordon finished fourth in his own car and Scott Pruett, a non-regular, finished in the top-ten substituting for David Stremme in Chip Ganassi's #40 Coors Light-sponsored Dodge.

Post-race penalties were handed out in the aftermath of a final-lap incident between Boris Said and Ryan Newman. After Said and Newman tangled in the "inner-loop", several cars made attempts to avoid the collision. Said was penalized for "rough-driving" with his incident with Newman and for skipping the bus-stop, sending him from 6th place to 31st. Ron Fellows, who originally finished 10th, was sent to 32nd after also skipping the bus-stop. Michael Waltrip was sent from 15th place to the last driver one lap down after making avoidable contact with Kyle Busch on the final lap, and then skipping the bus-stop.

Results

Race Statistics
 Time of race: 2:52:27
 Average Speed: 
 Pole Speed: 
 Cautions: 10 for 22 laps
 Margin of Victory: 0.892 sec
 Lead changes: 14
 Percent of race run under caution: 24.4%         
 Average green flag run: 6.2 laps

References

AMD at The Glen
AMD at The Glen
NASCAR races at Watkins Glen International
August 2006 sports events in the United States